Rapaura is a village northwest of Blenheim, New Zealand. The Wairau River flows past to the north. Spring Creek lies to the east.

Rapaura consists of a church and a school. It also has high quality land for growing grapes.

Demographics

Lower Wairau had a population of 1,212 at the 2018 New Zealand census, an increase of 45 people (3.9%) since the 2013 census, and an increase of 36 people (3.1%) since the 2006 census. There were 456 households. There were 633 males and 576 females, giving a sex ratio of 1.1 males per female. The median age was 48.4 years (compared with 37.4 years nationally), with 213 people (17.6%) aged under 15 years, 144 (11.9%) aged 15 to 29, 621 (51.2%) aged 30 to 64, and 234 (19.3%) aged 65 or older.

Ethnicities were 90.1% European/Pākehā, 10.4% Māori, 1.7% Pacific peoples, 2.5% Asian, and 3.5% other ethnicities (totals add to more than 100% since people could identify with multiple ethnicities).

The proportion of people born overseas was 15.1%, compared with 27.1% nationally.

Although some people objected to giving their religion, 55.4% had no religion, 34.9% were Christian, 0.2% were Hindu, 0.2% were Buddhist and 1.0% had other religions.

Of those at least 15 years old, 195 (19.5%) people had a bachelor or higher degree, and 141 (14.1%) people had no formal qualifications. The median income was $43,700, compared with $31,800 nationally. The employment status of those at least 15 was that 576 (57.7%) people were employed full-time, 171 (17.1%) were part-time, and 15 (1.5%) were unemployed.

Education
Rapaura School is a coeducational full primary (years 1-8) school with a roll of  The school opened in 1862.

Notes

Populated places in the Marlborough Region